Andre C. Shelby (born December 8, 1966) is a U.S. Paralympic archer, the defending Paralympic and Parapan champion.

Shelby was born in Jeffersonville, Indiana in 1966 to Lee and Etta Shelby. He graduated from Jeffersonville High School in 1985. At Jeffersonville, Shelby played football and basketball.

Shelby served in the United States Navy for 18 years until an April 2004 motorcycle accident made him reliant on a wheelchair and forced him to retire. Shelby had worked as a boatswain's mate and helped transport troops during the Gulf War.

Shelby discovered archery in 2008. He qualified for the 2016 Summer Paralympics by winning gold at the 2015 Parapan American Games. In the 2016 Summer Paralympics, his debut Paralympics, Shelby won his first Paralympic medal which was gold. He became the first African-American archer to compete in the Paralympics.

References

1966 births
Living people
African-American sportsmen
American male archers
Archers at the 2016 Summer Paralympics
Paralympic archers of the United States
United States Navy sailors
Medalists at the 2016 Summer Paralympics
Paralympic medalists in archery
Paralympic gold medalists for the United States
Medalists at the 2015 Parapan American Games
Sportspeople from Indiana
People from Jeffersonville, Indiana
United States Navy personnel of the Gulf War
20th-century African-American sportspeople
21st-century African-American people
African-American United States Navy personnel